Broken Idol (Italian:Idolo infranto) is a 1913 Italian silent film directed by Emilio Ghione and starring Francesca Bertini, Angelo Gallina and Alberto Collo.

Cast
 Francesca Bertini 
 Angelo Gallina 
 Alberto Collo

References

Bibliography
Moliterno, Gino. The A to Z of Italian Cinema. Scarecrow Press, 2009.

External links

1913 films
1910s Italian-language films
Films directed by Emilio Ghione
Italian silent short films
Italian black-and-white films